Crisnée is a municipality of Wallonia located in the province of Liège, Belgium. 

It covers an area of 16.83 km2 and on 1 January 2013 had a total population of 3,094, giving a population density on that date of 184 inhabitants per km2.

The municipality consists of the following districts: Crisnée, Fize-le-Marsal, Kemexhe, Odeur, and Thys.

Crisnée is twinned with the commune of Sansais, Nouvelle-Aquitaine, in western France.

See also
 List of protected heritage sites in Crisnée

References

External links
 

Municipalities of Liège Province